Brown Hill or Brownhill may refer to:

 Brown Hill, Victoria - a suburb in Ballarat, Victoria, Australia
 Brown Hill Creek - a river in Adelaide, South Australia
 Brown Hill, Mitcham - a hill in Mitcham, South Australia
 Electoral district of Brown Hill - an electorate in Western Australia
 Brownhill, a suburb in Blackburn, Lancashire, England
 Brownhill, County Fermanagh, a townland in County Fermanagh, Northern Ireland
 Brownhill, County Tyrone, a townland in County Tyrone, Northern Ireland
Brown Hill, Huntly

People
Brownhill (surname)

See also
 Brownhills, a town in West Midlands, England